Pandino is a comune (municipality) in the Province of Cremona in the Italian region Lombardy, located about  east of Milan and about  northwest of Cremona.

Pandino borders the following municipalities: Agnadello, Dovera, Monte Cremasco, Palazzo Pignano, Rivolta d'Adda, Spino d'Adda. The Castello Visconteo, built by Bernabò Visconti around 1355 as a hunting residence, stands near the center of town.

The scene in the film Call Me By Your Name where Elio conveys his feelings for Oliver was shot in a single take at the war memorial in Piazza Vittorio Emanuele. Scenes were also shot outside Visconti Castle.

Twin towns
Pandino is twinned with:
	
  Saint-Denis-en-Val, France, since 2001

References

External links
 Official website

Cities and towns in Lombardy